This article gives an overview of well-known professional and amateur players of the board game Go throughout the ages. The page has been divided into sections based on the era in which the Go players played and the country in which they played. As this was not necessarily their country of birth, a flag of that country precedes every player's name. For a complete list of player articles, see :Category:Go players.

The important dates that this separation is based on are:
 The establishment of the Four go houses at the start of the Tokugawa Shogunate.
 The demise of the houses in the Meiji Period (end 19th century) followed by their replacement by the Nihon Kiin in 1924.
 The start of international tournament Go in 1989

A Japanese census on Go players performed in 2002 estimates that over 24 million people worldwide play Go, most of whom live in Asia. Most of the players listed on this article are professionals, though some top level amateurs have been included. Players famous for achievements outside Go are listed in their own section.

Prior to 17th century 
Wei Qi was recorded throughout the history of China. The first record of Wei Qi player was by Mencius.

China

17th through 19th centuries
In the 17th, 18th and 19th century, Go was popular in both Japan (Edo period) and China (period of the Qing dynasty). In Korea, a Go variant called Sunjang baduk was played.

Japan
At the start of the Tokugawa Shogunate, four Go academies were established. This table lists all heads of these houses, as well as some that were appointed heir but died before they became head of the house. Tokugawa also established the post of Godokoro (minister of Go), which was awarded to the strongest player of a generation. Such players were dubbed Meijin (brilliant man), which was considered equal to a 9 dan professional grade. Over the 300-year period covered here, only ten players received the title of Meijin. Several other players (16 total) received the title of Jun-Meijin (half-Meijin), which is considered to equal an 8 dan professional grade and listed as such below. In some houses it was the custom that the head of the house was always named the same according to the iemoto system (家元). All heads of the house Inoue (井上) were named Inseki (因碩), heads of the house Yasui (安井 ) were named Senkaku (仙角) from the 4th head onward, and heads of the house Hayashi (林) were named Monnyu (門入) from the second head onward. To distinguish between these players, the names listed below are the names they had before becoming head of their house, or after their retirement. The house Honinbo (本因坊) had no such tradition, although heads would often take one character from the name of their predecessor into their own name, notably the character Shu (秀) from the 14th head onward.

*All ranks are professional dan grades unless otherwise noted.

China

*Players could achieve the level of Guoshou (literally National Hand), which is best in the nation and ranked 1 pin 品. This title is a derivation of Mencius description of Yi Qiu (弈秋), Qiu the Yi player in 《孟子·告子章句上》: 今夫弈之为数，小数也。不专心致志，则不得也。弈秋，通国之善弈者也。使弈秋诲二人弈，其一人专心致志，惟弈秋之为听；一人虽听之，一心以为有鸿鹄将至，思援弓缴而射之，虽与俱学，弗若之矣！as being "通国之善弈者", literally the finest Yi player of the whole nation. It is considered to be equal to the Japanese title of Meijin. 
The term Qi Sheng (棋圣) was first mentioned by Ge Hong (葛洪) in 《抱朴子》：“棋之无敌者，则谓之棋圣。” The literal meaning is the Invincible Qi player is called the Saint of Qi (Qi Sheng). 
Note that both Guoshou and Qisheng were not tournament winner titles; instead they were honorific titles used by Wei Qi players and historians respectively to refer to the best players who were invincible in highest graded tournaments. Guoshou was the normal term used to refer to the promo player while he was alive, whereas Qisheng was used more as posthumous fame. 
The ranking of players began in West Han dynasty (2nd century BCE) and formally recognized by the Governments during the North and South Dynasties Period (3rd to 6th century CE). There were 9 ranks called pin 品 in the system, the same as the ranking system for government officials. The lowest rank was 9 pin, then 8 pin, etc. up to 1 pin. The difference of the lower 5 pin was about 1 zi (子, piece or stone), and the difference between the top 4 pin was half zi.

20th century

Japan

Women

China

Note: China formally adopted dan ranking in the early 1980s. Taiwan still uses pin ranking in addition to dan ranking.

Korea

Taiwan

 Note: Taiwan still uses pin ranking in addition to dan ranking.

United States

Europe

See also 
 Go professional
 List of top title holders in Go
 European Go players
 Female Go players
 International Go Federation
 List of Go organizations
 List of professional Go tournaments

References

External links
 Sensei's Library:ProfessionalPlayersGoStyles
 Gobase.org
 Recent pro games, daily updates

 
Players
Go players